2nd Verse is the second album by UK garage and urban music collective So Solid Crew, and the follow-up to They Don't Know. It was released on 29 September 2003. It peaked at #70 in the UK Albums Chart, and contains the singles "Broken Silence" and "So Grimey".

Track listing
"Intro"
"1st Verse"
"So Solid (Angry Beat)"
"So Grimy"
"Six 'o' Clock"
"More"
"How It Is"
"2nd Verse"
"Colder"
"Bou Bas (+ Remix)"
"Leave Us Alone"
"Money Maker (G-Man)"
"Thug Angel's (Initiation)"
"Ghetto Anthem"
"Broken Silence"
"No Love"
"Outro"

References

2003 albums
Independiente Records albums
So Solid Crew albums